Saïd Alibou Mhoudini (born 4 September 1984) is a former footballer who is last known to have played as a defender for UA Cognac. Born in France, he was a Comoros international.

Career

In 2006, Mhoudini signed for French second-tier side Istres, where he made 1 league appearance and scored 0 goals. In 2007, he signed for ACFC in the French fifth tier. In 2008, Mhoudini signed for Swiss second-tier club Locarno. Before the second half of 2008–09, he signed for Gardanne Biver in the French fifth tier. Before the second half of 2012–13, he signed for French sixth tier team UA Cognac.

References

External links
 

French sportspeople of Comorian descent
French expatriate footballers
French expatriate sportspeople in Switzerland
FC Locarno players
Ligue 2 players
Comoros international footballers
Living people
Association football forwards
1984 births
UA Cognac players
Comorian expatriate footballers
Expatriate footballers in Switzerland
FC Istres players
Angoulême Charente FC players
Championnat National 3 players
Comorian footballers
French footballers